1965 is a 2015 Singaporean historical thriller film directed by Randy Ang and co-directed by Daniel Yun. The film was released to commemorate Singapore's fifty years of independence and was released in cinemas on 30 July 2015. It stars Qi Yuwu, Deanna Yusoff, Joanne Peh, James Seah, Sezairi Sezali, Mike Kasem, and Lim Kay Tong as Singapore's founding prime minister Lee Kuan Yew.

Cast
 Qi Yuwu as Inspector Cheng
 Deanna Yusoff as Khatijah
 Joanne Peh as Zhou Jun
 James Seah as Seng
 Sezairi Sezali as Adi
 Mike Kasem as Raj
 Lim Kay Tong as Lee Kuan Yew
 Nicole Seah as Mei
 Sun Yi En as Xiao Yun
 Andi Hazriel as Rafi
 Benny Soh as Sgt Goh

Production
The film was conceptualised in five years.  The film shooting started in November 2014, with the biggest percentage shot in Batam, at various locations, and at Infinite Studios’ sound stages there.

Tony Leung Chiu-wai was initially supposed to play the role of Lee Kuan Yew. However, many Singaporeans were against this, as there was the preference of having a Singaporean actor for this role. The role was given to Lim Kay Tong. David Lee of the Singapore Film Society said that Lim "has the gravitas required of the role, and he's English-speaking as well". Lim prepared for the role for several months and visited the National Archives of Singapore at least five times a week to study Lee's audio and film clips.

Music
The two songs written for the film were Sezairi Sezali's "Selamat Pagi" and Gentle Bones' "Sixty Five". The latter was on the top of the iTunes Singapore song chart for four weeks.

Reception
John Lui of The Straits Times gave 1965 a 1.5 out of 5 stars. He said  "it wants to be Important, with a capital I", and "it feels only slightly more relevant to the national birthday than a chicken bun with an SG50 sticker slapped on it."

See also
 List of Singaporean films of 2015

References

External links

2015 films
2010s English-language films
2010s Mandarin-language films
Malay-language films
Singaporean thriller films
Films directed by Randy Ang
Films shot in Singapore
Films set in Singapore
Films set in 1965
2015 multilingual films
English-language Singaporean films
Singaporean multilingual films